Stara Huta may refer to:

Places in Slovakia
Stará Huta, a village in Slovakia

Places in Poland
Stara Huta, Garwolin County in Masovian Voivodeship (east-central Poland)
Stara Huta, Gdańsk County in Pomeranian Voivodeship (north Poland)
Stara Huta, Gmina Kartuzy in Pomeranian Voivodeship (north Poland)
Stara Huta, Gmina Sierakowice in Pomeranian Voivodeship (north Poland)
Stara Huta, Greater Poland Voivodeship (west-central Poland)
Stara Huta, Kuyavian-Pomeranian Voivodeship (north-central Poland)
Stara Huta, Lower Silesian Voivodeship (south-west Poland)
Stara Huta, Łuków County in Lublin Voivodeship (east Poland)
Stara Huta, Silesian Voivodeship (south Poland)
Stara Huta, Starovyzhivskyi Raion, in Volyn Oblast, Ukraine
Stara Huta, Subcarpathian Voivodeship (south-east Poland)
Stara Huta, Świętokrzyskie Voivodeship (south-central Poland)
Stara Huta, Zamość County in Lublin Voivodeship (east Poland)
Stara Huta, Żyrardów County in Masovian Voivodeship (east-central Poland)

Places in Ukraine
Stara Huta, Bohorodchany Raion, a village in Ivano-Frankivsk Oblast
Stara Huta, Seredyna-Buda Raion, a village in Sums'ka Oblast